A list of nations mentioned in the Bible.

A
Arabia
Armenia (in the King James Version), or the "Land of Ararat" (in other translations)
Province of Asia 
Assyria
 Amorites
 Avim

B

Babylon 
Bashan

C
Kingdom of Cappadocia
Crete
Cyprus
Corinthia

D
Dalmatia

E
Edom
Egypt 
Ethiopia

G
Gaul (modern France). Only found within the deuterocanonical First Book of Maccabees which is found in the Catholic and Eastern Orthodox bibles.
Gog (various times, mainly in the Prophets)
 
 Girgashites

H

 Hivites
 Hittites

I
Iran
India
Land of Israel (numerous times)
Italy

J
Jordan (Referring to the Jordan river)
Kingdom of Judah
Province of Judah
 Jebusites

K
Kingdom of Kush

L
Lebanon (numerous times, mainly referring to the cedar of Lebanon)
Libya
Lydia

M
Macedonia
Median Empire 
Mesopotamia

P
 Persia
Kingdom of Pontus
Perizzites

R
Ancient Rome

S
Samaria (Kingdom of Israel (Samaria))
Sheba 
Spain
Syria (Also referred to as Aram)
Sudan and South Sudan(Also referred to as Cush in some Bible versions)

References

Nations